The 1954–55 Liga Alef season was the last in which it was the Israel's top football league, as the following season it was replaced by Liga Leumit and became the country's second tier. It consisted of 14 clubs, the 12 from the top division in the previous season and two promoted clubs (Hapoel Hadera and Beitar Jerusalem). It used two points for a win and one for a draw.

The title was won by Hapoel Petah Tikva, the club's first championship, whilst Hapoel Hadera and Hapoel Balfouria (who had finished bottom the previous season) were relegated automatically. Beitar Jerusalem and Hapoel Kfar Saba took part in the promotion/relegation play-offs with the top two clubs from Liga Bet, in which Kfar Saba retained their place in the top division, but Beitar were relegated.

Final table

Results

Positions by round
The table lists the positions of teams after each week of matches. In order to preserve chronological evolvements, any postponed matches are not included to the round at which they were originally scheduled, but added to the full round they were played immediately afterwards. For example, if a match is scheduled for matchday 13, but then postponed and played between days 16 and 17, it will be added to the standings for day 17.

Top goalscorers

Source:

Promotion-relegation play-off
A promotion-relegation play-off between the 12th and 11th-placed teams in Liga Alef, Hapoel Kfar Saba and Beitar Jerusalem, and the winners of the regional divisions of Liga Bet, Maccabi Jaffa and Hapoel Kiryat Haim. Each team played the other three once.

References
Israel - List of Final Tables RSSSF
In the Play-offs Davar, 23.10.55, Historical Jewish Press
In the Play-offs Davar, 30.10.55, Historical Jewish Press
Hapoel Kfar Saba and Maccabi Jaffa promoted to Liga Leumit Davar, 6.11.55, Historical Jewish Press 

Liga Alef seasons
Israel
1954–55 in Israeli football leagues